Grégory Sarrasin (born March 17, 1979) is a male freestyle wrestler from Switzerland. He participated in Men's freestyle 66 kg at 2008 Summer Olympics. He was eliminated from competition by Emin Azizov in the 1/16 of final.

External links
 Wrestler bio on beijing2008.com

Living people
1979 births
Wrestlers at the 2008 Summer Olympics
Olympic wrestlers of Switzerland
Swiss male sport wrestlers
Place of birth missing (living people)